Hot Summer Nights is a 2017 American neo-noir coming-of-age crime drama film written and directed by Elijah Bynum, in his directorial debut. It stars Timothée Chalamet, Maika Monroe, Alex Roe, Maia Mitchell, William Fichtner, Thomas Jane, Rachel O'Shaughnessy, and Emory Cohen. Set on Cape Cod in the summer of 1991, the plot follows Daniel Middleton, a teenage boy who becomes entangled in the drug trade.

The film premiered at South by Southwest on March 13, 2017. It was released on June 28, 2018, through DirecTV Cinema, before beginning a theatrical limited release on July 27, 2018, by A24.

Plot
In 1991, Daniel, an awkward teenager, is sent by his mother to spend the summer with his aunt on Cape Cod after the death of his father. He is not excited about it at first, but soon he meets Hunter Strawberry, the bad boy in town. While working at a convenience store, Hunter hurriedly asks Daniel to hide marijuana from approaching police. They later become business partners in selling drugs from a man named Dex. He provides Daniel and Hunter with the marijuana they need to facilitate their business but warns them about the fatal consequences if he gets crossed.

Hunter's younger sister McKayla is the most crushed-on girl on Cape Cod. After escaping from her boyfriend at the drive-in, McKayla asks Daniel to take her home. Although Hunter forbids him to see McKayla, Daniel cannot help himself. At the summer carnival, he surprisingly kisses her, resulting in a beating by McKayla's boyfriend and his friends. Daniel and McKayla soon start dating secretly. At the same time, Hunter develops a relationship with Amy, the daughter of Sergeant Frank Calhoun, who becomes suspicious about his daughter's whereabouts.

Selling marijuana becomes very profitable, and Daniel and Hunter start to make a lot of money. Their success and rising tensions within their lives intertwine with the impending Hurricane Bob, soon to reach Cape Cod. Daniel wants to start selling cocaine without letting Dex know, but Dex finds out and wants Hunter to kill Daniel. Hunter tells Daniel to run and never come back, and when Dex finds Hunter, he kills him. McKayla sees her brother killed and flees town. According to the narrator, Daniel and McKayla are never seen again.

Cast
 Timothée Chalamet as Daniel "Danny" Middleton
 Alex Roe as Hunter Strawberry
 Maika Monroe as McKayla Strawberry
 Thomas Jane as Sergeant Frank Calhoun
 Maia Mitchell as Amy Calhoun
 Emory Cohen as Dex
 William Fichtner as Shep
 Jack Kesy as Ponytail
 Rachel O'Shaughnessy as Erin 
 Shane Epstein Petrullo as Narrator (voice)
 Lia McHugh as Summer Bird Sister

Production
On March 26, 2015, it was announced that Elijah Bynum would make his directorial debut with his own 2013 Black List script, Hot Summer Nights, set in 1991 Cape Cod. Imperative Entertainment would finance and produce the film with its Bradley Thomas and Dan Friedkin. On June 24, 2015, Maika Monroe, Timothée Chalamet, and Alex Roe were cast in the lead roles. Later, Maia Mitchell, Emory Cohen and Thomas Jane were also added to the cast. Filming began in August 2015 in Atlanta, Georgia, subbing in as Cape Cod.

Release
Hot Summer Nights premiered at South by Southwest on March 13, 2017. In September 2017, A24 and DirecTV Cinema acquired distribution rights to the film. It was released through DirecTV Cinema on June 28, 2018, before receiving a theatrical limited release by A24 on July 27, 2018.

Reception
On Rotten Tomatoes the film has an approval rating of 43% based on 40 reviews, with an average score of 5.21/10. The website's critical consensus reads, "Hot Summer Nights is easy on the eyes and clearly indebted to some great films, but its strengths – including a charismatic young cast – are often outweighed by its uninspired story." On Metacritic, the film has a weighted average score of 44 out of 100, based on 18 critics, indicating "mixed or average reviews".

Michael Roffman, writing for Consequence of Sound, praised the film, calling it "A brazen anti-coming-of-age thriller that oozes with all the right confidence, chutzpah, and passion." Peter Travers of Rolling Stone magazine gave the film 2.5 out of 5, and wrote, "The result is chaotic, but never lacking in energy – and the cast is up for anything."

IndieWire critic David Ehrlich criticized the script as "empty", and referred to the film as "A sweaty pastiche that shares its protagonist's desire to be all things to all people, only to wind up losing any sense of itself along the way." Emily Yoshida of Vulture was critical of the reliance on nostalgia and muddled storytelling, and wrote, "As it cliff dives, unprompted, into reheated cocaine-nightmare territory done better by any number of 1990s '70s nostalgia films before it, it not only ceases to be fun, but stops pretending it has any vision for where its lead characters should go."

References

External links
 
 
 

2017 films
2017 crime drama films
2017 directorial debut films
2017 independent films
2017 romantic drama films
2010s coming-of-age drama films
2010s teen drama films
2010s teen romance films
A24 (company) films
American coming-of-age drama films
American crime drama films
American films about cannabis
American romantic drama films
American teen drama films
American teen romance films
Coming-of-age romance films
Films about the illegal drug trade
Films about tropical cyclones
Films set in 1991
Films set in Massachusetts
Films shot in Georgia (U.S. state)
Teen crime films
2010s English-language films
2010s American films